Gateshead East was a parliamentary constituency represented in the House of Commons of the Parliament of the United Kingdom from 1950 to 1997. It elected one Member of Parliament (MP) by the first past the post system of election.

History
Gateshead East, as could be inferred from the name, formed the eastern part of the Borough of Gateshead, now in Tyne and Wear. The constituency was created by the Representation of the People Act 1948 for the 1950 general election when the existing Gateshead seat was split in two. It was abolished for the 1997 general election, when it was largely replaced by the new constituency of Gateshead East and Washington West, with smaller areas going to Tyne Bridge and Jarrow.

It returned Labour MPs for the entire period of its existence.

Boundaries

1950–1955 

 The County Borough of Gateshead wards of East, East Central, North East, South, and South Central.

1955–1964 

 The County Borough of Gateshead wards of East, South, and South Central; and
 the Urban District of Felling.

The East Central and North East wards were transferred to Gateshead West. Felling transferred from Jarrow.

1964–1983 

 The County Borough of Gateshead wards of Claxton, Enfield, Low Fell, and Wrekenton; and
 the Urban District of Felling.

Minor changes to reflect redistribution of local authority wards.

1983–1997 

 The Metropolitan Borough of Gateshead wards of Chowdene, Deckham, Felling, High Fell, Leam, Low Fell, Pelaw and Heworth, Saltwell, and Wrekendyke.

A small part included in the new constituency of Tyne Bridge. Gained parts of the abolished constituency of Gateshead West.

Members of Parliament

Elections

Elections in the 1950s

Elections in the 1960s

Elections in the 1970s

Elections in the 1980s

Elections in the 1990s

See also
 History of parliamentary constituencies and boundaries in Tyne and Wear
 History of parliamentary constituencies and boundaries in Durham

Notes and references

Parliamentary constituencies in Tyne and Wear (historic)
Constituencies of the Parliament of the United Kingdom established in 1950
Constituencies of the Parliament of the United Kingdom disestablished in 1997
Politics of Gateshead